This is a list of the heads of state of the modern Greek state, from its establishment during the Greek Revolution to the present day.

First Hellenic Republic (1822–1832)

Provisional Administration of Greece (Presidents of the Executive, 1822–1827)

Hellenic State (1827–1832)

Governing Councils (1832–1833)
Following the resignation of Augustinos Kapodistrias, a series of collective governing councils were established, but their authority was often only nominal.

Kingdom of Greece (1832–1924)

House of Wittelsbach (1832–1862)

The London Conference of 1832 was an international conference convened to establish a stable government in Greece. Negotiations between the three Great powers (United Kingdom, France and Russia) resulted in the establishment of the Kingdom of Greece under a Bavarian Prince. The decisions were ratified in the Treaty of Constantinople later that year.

The convention offered the throne to the Bavarian Prince, Otto. They also established the line of succession which would pass the crown to Otto's descendants, or his younger brothers should he have no issue. It was also decided that in no case there would be a personal union of the crowns of Greece and Bavaria. Otto went on to rule Greece until he was exiled in the 23 October 1862 Revolution.

House of Glücksburg (1863–1924)

In October 1862, King Otto was deposed in a popular revolt, but while the Greek people rejected Otto, they did not seem averse to the concept of monarchy per se. Many Greeks, seeking closer ties to the pre-eminent world power, Great Britain, rallied around the idea that Prince Alfred, the second son of Queen Victoria and Prince Albert, could become the next King. British Foreign Secretary Lord Palmerston believed that the Greeks were "panting for increase in territory", hoping that the election of Alfred as King would also result in the incorporation of the Ionian Islands, which were then a British protectorate, into an enlarged Greek state.

The London Conference of 1832, however, had prohibited any of the Great Powers' ruling families from accepting the crown of Greece, and in any event, Queen Victoria was adamantly opposed to the idea. Nevertheless, the Greeks insisted on holding a referendum on the issue of the head of state in November 1862. It was the first referendum ever held in Greece.

Prince Alfred turned down the Kingship and Prince William of Denmark, son of Prince Christian of Denmark, was elected by the National Assembly to become King George I of the Hellenes.

Second Hellenic Republic (1924–1935)
The Second Hellenic Republic was a parliamentary republic which was proclaimed on 25 March 1924 and a referendum was held to abolish the Monarchy. The Second Republic was abolished after the 1935 monarchy referendum.

Status

Kingdom of Greece (1935–1973)

House of Glücksburg (1935–1973)

Republic under the Greek junta (1973–1974)
On 1 June 1973 the junta abolished the monarchy and replaced it with a presidential republic. The abolition of the monarchy was approved by a rigged referendum held on 29 July 1973.

Third Hellenic Republic (1974–present)
On 24 July 1974, the junta was overthrown and democracy restored. A second referendum, held on 8 December 1974, confirmed the abolition of the monarchy and the establishment of the current parliamentary republic, with the President of the Republic as the head of state.

Status

Timeline

Head of state titles

See also
 Politics of Greece
 List of kings of Greece
 List of regents of Greece
 List of prime ministers of Greece

Notes

External links

 List of Greek heads of state and government
 The President of the Hellenic Republic
 Greek Royal Family

Greece

Heads of state